State Route 287 (SR 287) is a  north-south state highway located entirely in Warren County in Middle Tennessee. It connects Viola with Rock Island via Morrison, Centertown, Midway, and Rock Island State Park. SR 287’s routing is somewhat unique in that it forms a nearly C-shaped arch around the southern, western, and northern sides of McMinnville.

Route description

SR 287 begins just north of the town of Viola at an intersection with SR 108/SR 127 (Viola Road). It heads northwest through farmland and rural areas as Morrison Viola Road for several miles, where it crosses a bridge over a creek, to enter the town of Morrison along S Fair Street and come to an intersection with SR 55 (Manchester Highway). The highway then passes through downtown, where it has a short concurrency with SR 379 (Maple Street), before leaving Morrison along N Main Street. SR 287 turns north along Jacksboro Road through rural areas for several miles, where it crosses the Barren Fork River, to pass through the town of Centertown, where it has a short concurrency with US 70S (Nashville Highway/SR 1). It winds its way northeast as W Green Hill Road through farmland for several miles before turning east and passing just north of the Dibrell community, where it has an intersection with SR 56 (Smithville Highway). The highway winds southeast through more hilly areas along E Green Hill Road to pass through the community of Midway, where it has an intersection with SR 288 (Francis Ferry Road). SR 287 now becomes Great Falls Road and continues east to pass through Rock Island State Park, where it passes by the Great Falls Dam and crosses the mouth of the Collins River, before entering the community of Rock Island and come to an end at an intersection with SR 136 (Rock Island Road). The entire route of SR 287 is a two-lane highway.

Major intersections

References

287
Transportation in Warren County, Tennessee